Pavel Janeček (born 7 April 1994) is a Czech swimmer. He competed at the 2016 Summer Olympics in the men's 400 metre individual medley; his time of 4:22.09 in the heats did not qualify him for the final.

References

1994 births
Living people
Czech male swimmers
Olympic swimmers of the Czech Republic
Swimmers at the 2016 Summer Olympics
Male medley swimmers